Sestao Sport Club was a Spanish football club based in Sestao, in the autonomous community of Basque Country. Founded it 1916 it held home matches at Campo Municipal de las Llanas, with a capacity of 8,900 seats.

History
Sestao managed to play 17 seasons in Segunda División, first staying seven seasons from 1954 but before the creation of Segunda División B, then from 1985 to 1993.

After the 1995–96 campaign, its final in level two, Sestao, which had been relegated through play, suffered another drop off, and folded due to unsurmountable economic problems. Following its demise, Sestao River Club was founded.

Season to season

17 seasons in Segunda División
10 seasons in Segunda División B
30 seasons in Tercera División

References

 
Defunct football clubs in the Basque Country (autonomous community)
Association football clubs established in 1916
Association football clubs disestablished in 1996
Sestao River
1916 establishments in Spain
1996 disestablishments in Spain
Sport in Biscay
Segunda División clubs